The South Africa men's national softball team is the men's national softball team of South Africa administered by Softball South Africa. The team competed at the 1996 ISF Men's World Championship in Midland, Michigan where they finished with 7 wins and 4 losses with Papate Mphahlele as pitcher of the season.  The team competed at the 2000 ISF Men's World Championship in East London, South Africa where they finished eighth. The team competed at the 2004 ISF Men's World Championship in Christchurch, New Zealand where they finished twelfth.  The team competed at the 2009 ISF Men's World Championship in Saskatoon, Saskatchewan where they finished fifteenth.

References

Softball
Men's national softball teams
Men's sport in South Africa
Softball in South Africa